The Rans S-19 Venterra (English: wind over the earth) is an American single-engined, tractor configuration, two-seats in side-by-side configuration, low-wing monoplane designed by Randy Schlitter as a light-sport aircraft and manufactured by Rans Inc. The Venterra is available as a complete factory-built aircraft and in kit form for amateur construction.

Design and development
The S-19 was designed by Randy Schlitter in 2007 as a purpose-designed aircraft to take advantage of the new US LSA category, with the intention of offering the aircraft as a factory-complete Special LSA and as a kit-built Experimental LSA or amateur-built.

Unlike most other Rans models, which feature a welded 4130 steel tube cockpit with a bolted aluminum tube rear fuselage, the S-19 is an aluminum  semi-monocoque design, with stressed skin construction supported with bulkheads, formers and stringers. The fuselage, wing and tail surfaces are covered in sheet aluminum. The wings are equipped with flaps.

The S-19 has tricycle landing gear with a fully castering nosewheel and steering via differential main wheel braking.

The designer originally intended to break with the company tradition of providing a name for the aircraft and just designate the aircraft as "S-19". Early aviation media reports referred to it as the "S-19 Sport Plane". But after confusion and inquiries by air traffic control during early flights, Schlitter decided a name was needed, saying, "It is a bit of poetic license, but with 19 designs it has become a challenge to create names that are original, we like the sound of Venterra over the radio, it is easy to say, and should satisfy ATC."

Operational history
In March 2017 there were 41 S-19s registered in the United States, none in Canada and one in the UK.

Variants
S-19
Initial version, kit-built aircraft for the US ELSA or experimental amateur-built categories, powered by a  Rotax 912ULS
S-19LS
Factory-built version, for the US SLSA category, powered by a  Rotax 912ULS

Accidents and notable incidents

On 25 June 2017 a Rans S-19 crashed near Hyde, Central Otago, New Zealand, resulting in one death and one serious injury. The Civil Aviation Authority of New Zealand investigation found that the design of the stabilator anti-servo tab trim control resulted in inadvertent activation and a sudden departure from controlled flight. The investigation led to the issuance of a Continuing Airworthiness Notice about deficiencies in the stick grip design and associated hazards.

Specifications (S-19LS)

See also

References

External links

Official page - homebuilt S-19 
Official page - ready to fly S-19 
Photo of S-19LS on Airliners.net

2000s United States civil utility aircraft
Homebuilt aircraft
Light-sport aircraft
S-019 Venterra
Low-wing aircraft
Single-engined tractor aircraft
Aircraft first flown in 2007